Hans Pedersen (1887–1943) was a Danish. gymnast.

Hans Pedersen may also refer to:

Hans Eiler Pedersen (1890–1971), Danish. gymnast

See also
Hans Pedersen Herrefosser (1800–1869), Norwegian politician
Hans Pedersen-Dan (1859–1939), Danish sculptor
Hans Petersen (disambiguation)